Snehituda...()  is a 2009 Indian Telugu-language romantic drama film directed by Satyam Bellamkonda. It stars Nani and Maadhavi Latha. Prasad produced this film on Satya Entertainment's Banner. Sivaram Shankar provided the music. The movie was released on 7 August 2009.

Plot 
Sai (Nani) is an orphan who lies in court for a few bucks. Being homeless he stays on homes at nights like a thief. One night he went to stay on a villa where he is caught by Savitri (Maadhavi Latha). He begs her to let him stay for that night. She makes fun of him. In a sudden turn she runs away from home. Later that night she is caught by him in a park. She tells him that she is lost. He thinks that she lost her memory and he makes her join him as a partner in his lies in court. Eventually his kind and gentle nature makes her fall for him.

In a dramatic circumstance she tells him about herself. She is a daughter of well respected landlord (Nassar) in her village. She is very interested to tour with her friends, but her father rejected her wish. Savitri runs away from home. She is kidnapped by a gang who decide to rape her. Sai tries to stay nearby. Meanwhile, her angered father decides that her daughter is dead. After hearing her story Sai decides to reunite Savitri with her family.

Cast
 Nani as Sai
 Maadhavi Latha as Savitri
 Nassar as Srinivasa Rao
Apoorva
 Brahmanandam
 Gundu Hanumantha Rao
 MS Narayana
 Kinnera
 Prudhvi Raj
 Duvvasi Mohan

Reception 
Deepa Garimella felt that the film drew a fine line between thriller and family drama. She praised the first half of the film as "a pretty entertaining watch", but panned the second half for its "outdated climax" and "cheesy dialogue". Overall, she gave the film a rating of 4.5/10, not recommending it for kids.

References

External links 

2000s Telugu-language films
2009 films